Zhujiajiao (Shanghainese: Chukakoq) is an ancient town located in the Qingpu District of Shanghai. The population of Zhujiajiao is 95,536.

Zhujiajiao is a water town on the outskirts of Shanghai, and was established about 1,700 years ago. Archaeological findings dating back 5,000 years have also been found. 36 stone bridges and numerous rivers line Zhujiajiao, and many ancient buildings still line the riverbanks today.

Historic sights
The village prospered through clothing and rice businesses. Today, old historical buildings such as rice shops, banks, spice stores and even a Qing dynasty post office can still be found.

Zhujiajiao has many sights of historic interest, such as Fangsheng Bridge, Kezhi Garden and the Yuanjin Buddhist Temple.

However, recent overdevelopment threatens the village's authenticity - most notably the current (since 2012) conversion of its people's square into shops and the large-scale shopping and entertainment complexes being constructed in and around the Old Town.

Cuisine
The town is also famous for its cuisine, particularly green soy beans, Zarou, lotus roots and other foods.

Transportation
Because of its large number of waterways, much of Zhujiajiao's transport is by boat. Zhujiajiao is within walking distance of Zhujiajiao station on Line 17 of the Shanghai Metro.

Gallery

References

External links

 Official government of Zhujiajiao 
 Official website 

Towns in Shanghai
Divisions of Qingpu District